Corne, Cornè, Corné or Cornes may refer to:

Places
 Corne de Sorebois, a mountain in the Pennine Alps in Switzerland
 La Corne, Quebec, a municipality in the Canadian province of Quebec
 Corné, a commune in the Maine-et-Loire department in France
 Corne (river), a tributary of the Saône in the Saône-et-Loire department in France

People
Given name
 Corne Bodenstein (born 1992), South African-born cricketer for Jersey
 Corne Du Plessis (born 1978), South African sprinter
 Corné Fourie (born 1988), South African rugby union player
 Corné Krige (born 1975), South African rugby union player
 Corne Nel, South African rugby league player
 Corné Steenkamp (born 1982), South African rugby union player
 Corné van Kessel (born 1991), Dutch cyclist
Surname
 Louis de la Corne, Chevalier de la Corne (1703–1761), Franco-Canadian soldier
 Luc de la Corne (1711–1784), Franco-Canadian soldier, brother of the above
 Michele Felice Cornè (1752–1845), Italian-American painter
 Chad Cornes (born 1979), Australian footballer
 Chris Cornes (born 1986), English footballer
 Graham Cornes (born 1948), Australian footballer
 Jerry Cornes (1910–2001), English middle-distance runner
 Kane Cornes (born 1983), Australian footballer
 Lee Cornes (born 1951), English actor
 Nicole Cornes (born 1970), Australian political candidate

See also
 Corn (disambiguation)
 Korn (disambiguation)
 Korne (disambiguation)

French-language surnames